The Lie is a 1918 American silent drama film produced by Famous Players-Lasky and distributed by Artcraft Pictures, an affiliate of Paramount. J. Searle Dawley directed and stage star Elsie Ferguson starred in a story based on a 1914 play by Henry Arthur Jones and starring Margaret Illington. The film is now lost.

Cast
Elsie Ferguson as Elinor Shale
David Powell as Gerald Forster
John L. Shine as Sir Robert Shale
Percy Marmont as Nol Dibdin
Charles Sutton as Hamp
Bertha Kent as Gibbard
Maude Turner Gordon as Lady Beachworth
Betty Howe as Lucy Shale

Reception
Like many American films of the time, The Lie was subject to cuts by city and state film censorship boards. For example, the Chicago Board of Censors issued an Adults Only permit for the film.

See also
The House That Shadows Built (1931 promotional film by Paramount); a possibility that the unnamed Ferguson clip is from The Lie.

References

External links

Still photo of scene with Elsie Ferguson, Betty Howe, and David Powell (Powell erroneously referred to as Norman Kerry)
Lantern slide

1918 films
American silent feature films
Famous Players-Lasky films
American films based on plays
Films directed by J. Searle Dawley
Lost American films
1918 drama films
Silent American drama films
American black-and-white films
1918 lost films
Lost drama films
Censored films
1910s American films